Ducktails is the self-titled debut studio album by American recording project Ducktails, released on May 11, 2009 on Not Not Fun. The album is the first of two full-length albums released in 2009, with Landscapes following three months later.

Artwork
Regarding the album's artwork, Matt Mondanile noted: "The first record – all those stripes – that’s this artist in Finland named Jan Anderzen. He makes this insane-o music, but I was super into his art for a long time. He just makes these crazy paintings. I always want artists to do things."

Reception

In a positive review, Allmusic's Jesse Jarnow wrote: "perhaps the most productive way to think of Mondanile's work is as beach-time ambience, like Boards of Canada, should they choose to roam the vast Jersey Shore of the mind instead of their own icy wastes.

Track listing

References

2009 albums
Ducktails (band) albums